Legacy of the Scottish Harpers is a folk album released in 1986 by Robin Williamson.

Williamson had taken an interest in placing the harp in his music ever since Sylvia Woods played it in Williamson's album Journey's Edge. On this album, Williamson has complete focus on utilizing the harp for his somber Celtic and folk tracks.

Track listing 
All pieces traditionally arranged by Robin Williamson.

Scottish Cap/Scotland
Floweres of the Forest Cromlets Lilt/ Chevy Chase
Weel Hoddleed Lucky/The Lochaben Harper
Gilderoy/Cow the Gowans
MacGregor's Lamentation/MacGregor's Search
Kilt Thy Coat Maggie/Three Sheepskins
Lord Dundee's Lamentation/ The Brae's O' Killiekrankie
I'll Mak Ye Fain to Follow Me/Shame Fa' the Gear and the blathrie O't Donald Couper
Lady Cassilis' Lilt/The Auld Jew/The Broom O'Cowdenknoes
MacDonald of the Isles' Salutation
Rushes/Birk and Green Hollin
Soor Plooms
Jockey Drucken Babble/Sae Mirrie As We Hae Been/Jockey Went To The Wood 
Omnia Vincent Amor/The Banks Of Helicon/Deil Tak The Wars

References

Robin Williamson albums
1986 albums